Isobubbialine is a chemical compound first found in Phyllanthus niruri. It is related to bubbialine.

References 

Tetracyclic compounds
Nitrogen heterocycles
Secondary alcohols
Furanones